Mississippi Records is a record store and label. It was founded by Eric Isaacson in 2003 in Portland, Oregon. It also houses a café, equipment repair shop, and the Portland Museum of Modern Art. The Mississippi Records motto is: "Love over gold."

Brick and mortar store 
The Mississippi Records store is currently located at 5202 N Albina Ave, Portland, Oregon.

The name Mississippi Records originates from Isaacson's original store location at 4009 N Mississippi Ave, Portland, Oregon. Isaacson started Mississippi Records in 2003, opening the store with "5000 dollars saved up" and 500 records. According to a video interview by the documentary project 12 Inches of Sound, Isaacson--a Los Angeles native who moved to Portland in 1999--recognized that North Portland lacked a record store. Isaacson worked previously as a manager at Oakland's now-defunct Saturn Records.

History of record label 
Alex Yusimov, an employee of the brick and mortar store, was among the first to release recordings under the Mississippi Records aegis, using the store address and the name for a personal pop record release. As such, according to Eric Isaacson, "the first 5 Mississippi releases had nothing to do with me."

For many years Isaacson ran Mississippi Records from Portland with co-founder/co-owner Warren Hill. Isaacson and Hill have been friends since they were teenagers. Isaacson is historically taciturn about speaking on Mississippi's background: "I haven't really found a way of finding great joy in sharing this information because the records are a better messenger for my ideas than anything I could say and a lot of times when you talk about stuff it just loses a lot of its power."

Mississippi Records co-founder Warren Hill has cited The Origin Jazz Library, Smithsonian Folkways, Arhoolie Records, Sublime Frequencies, and Herwin as sources of inspiration for Mississippi Records compilations. Many of the Mississippi Records compilations have been mastered by Timothy Stollenwerk, who owns Stereophonic Mastering in Portland.

Warren Hill formed his own record label Little Axe Records in 2011, also based in Portland, "when the original Mississippi Records label split."

On January 1, 2019, filmmaker Cyrus Moussavi and musician Gordon Ashworth became the new owners with Isaacson working as a label project manager. Mississippi Records relocated to Chicago. In 2019, Mississippi Records went on a national tour.

Mississippi Records Tape Series 
The Mississippi Records Tape Series is an ongoing open-edition mix tape project. Mississippi Records store employee Karen Atunes originally suggested the idea for a low-price mix tape to Eric Isaacson, with the first tape appearing in 2005. According to Discogs, the Mississippi tapes "are often personal statements of theme, emotion or subject by Eric Isaacson, his friends or employees at the shop." Most of the tapes in the series contain a hand-drawn, black and white aesthetic, xeroxed J-card.

References

External links
 
 Discogs list of Mississippi Records Tape Series releases - https://www.discogs.com/label/345965-Tape-Series?page=1
 Little Axe Records - https://www.littleaxerecords.com
 Timothy Stollenwerk's Stereophonic Mastering - https://www.stereopho.com

2003 establishments in Oregon
American independent record labels
Oregon record labels
Record labels established in 2003
Music of Chicago
Companies based in Chicago